A climate target, climate goal or climate pledge is a measurable commitment for climate policy and energy policy with the aim of limiting the climate change. Researchers within, among others, the UN climate panel have identified probable consequences of global warming for people and nature at different levels of warming. Based on this, politicians in a large number of countries have agreed on temperature targets for warming, which is the basis for scientifically calculated carbon budgets and ways to achieve these targets. This in turn forms the basis for politically decided global and national emission targets for greenhouse gases, targets for fossil-free energy production and efficient energy use, and for the extent of planned measures for climate change mitigation and adaptation. Many climate targets are implemented in national climate legislation.

Calculation of Emissions Targets 
An emissions target or greenhouse gas emissions reduction target is a central policy instrument of international greenhouse gas emissions reduction politics and a key pillar of climate policy. They typically include heavy consideration of emissions budgets, which are calculated using rate of warming per standard emission of carbon dioxide, a historic baseline temperature, a desired level of confidence and a target global average temperature to stay below.

An "emissions target" may be distinguished from an emissions budget, as an emissions target may be internationally or nationally set in accordance with objectives other than a specific global temperature. This includes targets created for their political palatability, rather than budgets scientifically determined to meet a specific temperature target.

A country's determination of emissions targets is based on careful consideration of pledged NDCs (nationally determined contributions), economic and social feasibility, and political palatability. Carbon budgets can provide political entities with knowledge of how much carbon can be emitted before likely reaching a certain temperature threshold, but specific emissions targets take more into account. The exact way these targets are determined varies widely from country to country. Variation in emissions targets and time to complete them depends on factors such as accounting of land-use emissions, afforestation capacity of a country, and a countries transport emissions. Importantly, emissions targets also depend on their hypothesized reception.

Many emissions pathways, budgets and targets also rely on the implementation of negative emissions technology. These currently undeveloped technologies are predicted to pull net emissions down even as source emissions are not reduced.

Effectiveness of Targets 
Many countries' emissions targets are above the scientifically calculated allowable emissions to remain below a certain temperature threshold. In 2015, many countries pledged NDCs to limit the increase in the global average temperature to well below 2 °C above pre-industrial levels. Many of the largest emitters of GHGs, however, are on track to push global average temperature to as much as 4 °C. Some of these projections contradict agreements made in the 2015 Paris Agreement, meaning countries are not keeping to their pledged NDCs.

In addition, it is uncertain how effective many emissions targets and accompanying policies really are. For example, with countries that have high consumption-based carbon emissions, strictly enforced, aligned and coordinated international policy measures determine the effectiveness of targets. In addition, many ambitious policies are proposed and passed but are not practically enforced or regulated, or have unintended consequences. China's ETS (emissions trading scheme), while seeming to have an effect on reducing production-based emissions also promoted outsourcing of emissions contributing to a further imbalance of carbon transfer among China's different provinces. The ETS evaluation also did not account for exported consumption-based emissions.

Many countries aim to reach net zero emissions in the next few decades. In order to reach this goal however, there must be a radical shift in energy infrastructure. For example, in the United States, political entities are attempting to switch away from coal and oil based energy by replacing plants with natural gas combined cycle (NGCC) power plants. However many find this transition to not be significant enough to reach net-zero emissions. More significant changes, for example using biomass energy with carbon capture and storage (BECCS) are suggested as a viable option to transition to net-zero emissions countries.

See also 

 Global warming
 Intergovernmental Panel on Climate Change
 United Nations Climate Change conference
 Nationally Determined Contributions
 Bioenergy with Carbon Capture and Storage
 Paris Agreement
 List of countries by greenhouse gas emissions per capita

References

Greenhouse gas emissions
Environmental science